Morris Mike Medavoy (born January 21, 1941) is an American film producer and business executive. He is the co-founder of Orion Pictures (1978), former chairman of TriStar Pictures, former head of production for United Artists (1974–1978), and the current chairman and CEO of Phoenix Pictures.

Early life and education
Morris Mike Medavoy was born in Shanghai, China. His father, Michael, was a garage mechanic and his mother, Dora, owned a dress shop and Chinese actresses as clients. His parents were both from Jewish families. His mother was born in Harbin, Manchuria (to parents originally from Odessa), and his father was born in Ukraine. Medavoy lived in Chile from 1947 to 1957, and he studied at the Liceo Valentín Letelier de Santiago learning to speak Spanish fluently in addition to Russian, which is his first language. The family moved to Los Angeles and they lived with Medavoy's aunt. He became an American citizen in 1963 and graduated from UCLA that same year. Joining the U.S. Army Reserve in 1963 he served at Fort Ord in California until 1969.

Career
Medavoy began his career at Universal Studios in 1964. In 1965 he became an agent at the General Artists Corporation later moving to Creative Management Associates.  He became Creative Management's vice president of the motion picture department in 1967, working with Steven Spielberg and Francis Ford Coppola among others. He headed to International Famous Agency in 1970.

In 1974, United Artists brought Medavoy in as senior vice president of production. There he was part of the team responsible for making One Flew Over the Cuckoo's Nest, Rocky, and Annie Hall, which won Best Picture Oscars in 1975, 1976, and 1977 respectively. United Artists made more notable films at the time including Apocalypse Now, Raging Bull, Network, The Black Stallion, and Coming Home.

Orion Pictures
In 1978, Medavoy co-founded Orion Pictures which was a joint venture with Warner Brothers, and fellow United Artists executives Arthur Krim; Robert Benjamin; Eric Pleskow; and William Bernstein. While Medavory was at Orion, the company released notable and successful films including Platoon, Amadeus, RoboCop, Hannah and Her Sisters, The Terminator, Dances with Wolves, and The Silence of the Lambs.

TriStar Pictures
In 1990, Medavoy became the chairman of TriStar Pictures and oversaw the release of films such as Philadelphia, Terminator 2: Judgment Day, Sleepless in Seattle, Cliffhanger, The Fisher King, Legends of the Fall, and Hook. He left in 1994 after having disputes with Sony Pictures chairman Peter Guber.

Phoenix Pictures

In 1995, Medavoy co-founded Phoenix Pictures with Arnold W. Messer which they set up at Sony Pictures Entertainment in November. As its chairman and CEO, he co-produced such films as The People vs. Larry Flynt, The Mirror Has Two Faces, U Turn, Apt Pupil, The Thin Red Line, The 6th Day, Basic, All the King's Men, Zodiac, Pathfinder, and Miss Potter, among others. The Thin Red Line and The People vs. Larry Flynt received Oscar nominations. Phoenix Pictures has produced Shutter Island and Black Swan. Shutter Island was released on February 19, 2010, earning over $42 million its opening weekend. Black Swan was directed by Darren Aronofsky and won numerous awards including the Oscar® and Golden Globe for Best Actress (Natalie Portman).

In 2011, Medavoy announced a project depicting the 2010 Chilean mining accident that left 33 men trapped underground for 69 days. He collaborated with Chilean officials and Academy Award-nominated screenwriter José Rivera; they created an authentic retelling of the story. Medavoy explains, "at its heart, [it is] about the triumph of the human spirit and a testament to the courage and perseverance of the Chilean people". 

Also in 2011 Medavoy announced his collaboration with The Shanghai Film Group to create both a feature film and six-hour miniseries. The feature was an adaptation of the novel The Cursed Piano, a love story set in Japanese-occupied China about persecuted Jews seeking refuge from occupied Europe. The mini-series, Tears of a Sparrow focuses in detail on the experiences of the Jews in Shanghai. Medavoy also worked on Dandelion Wine which was adapted from a novel with the same name written by Ray Bradbury. 

In 2015, it was announced that he and Eric Esrailian would produce The Promise which stars Oscar Isaac and Christian Bale.

Community contributions and other memberships
Medavoy was appointed to the board of directors of the Museum of Science and Industry in Los Angeles by Governor Jerry Brown and was appointed by Mayor Richard Riordan as a commissioner on the Los Angeles Board of Parks and Recreations. He is a member of the board of directors of the University of Tel Aviv. He also serves on the board of trustees of the UCLA Foundation and is a member of the Chancellor's Associates, the Dean's Advisory Board at the UCLA School of Theater, Film and Television; and the Alumni Association's Student Relations Committee. Medavoy is the co-chairman of the Burkle Center for UCLA's Center for International Relations and served as a member of the board of advisors at the John F. Kennedy School of Government at Harvard University for five years. In 2002, Governor Gray Davis appointed him to the California Anti-Terrorism Information Center's Executive Advisory Board; he is a member of both the Council on Foreign Relations and the Homeland Security Advisory Council. Medavoy is also on the Baryshnikov Arts Center Advisory Committee in New York, and serves on the advisory board of the USC Center on Public Diplomacy. The Medavoys' charity work includes C.O.A.C.H. For Kids (Community Outreach Assistance for Children's Heath, with Cedar Sinai Medical Center) and Irena Medavoy is the Executive Vice Chairman. The agency provides free medical care to inner city children.

Mike Medavoy was a close friend of Marlon Brando and is co-executor of the late actor's estate.

Involvement in politics
In 1984, Medavoy was the co-finance chair of the Gary Hart campaign. He also actively participated in President Clinton's campaigns in 1992 and 1996. In 2008, he supported Barack Obama's candidacy and his wife, Irena, served as the co-finance chair of the campaign.

Personal life
He was married to Marcia Rogers, the daughter of publicist Henry C. Rogers and Roz (Jaffe) Rogers and former wife of Mark Goddard. In 1986, he married political activist Patricia Duff. In 1993, they separated and divorced; she remarried Ron Perelman in 1994.

He is presently married to Irena Gerasimenko, a philanthropist, activist, former model, actress, and co-founder of Team Safe-T (which endeavors to prepare schools for emergency situations). Gerasimenko is a charity executive and fundraiser for Industry Task Force. The couple has a son, Nick. (Mike Medavoy has a producer son Brian Medavoy from a previous marriage). Irena Medavoy writes for The Huffington Post about the topic of unrealistic female media images. When their son, Nick (who is 6'8") was born, Mike Medavoy sang 'Singing In the Rain' to him.

Awards
In 2011, UNICEF and Oscar winner Sean Penn presented the Medavoy family a humanitarian award,

 1980 - Honored by the Society of Fellows of the Anti-Defamation League
 1992 - Motion Picture Pioneer of the Year Award
 1997 - UCLA Career Achievement Award
 1998 - The Cannes Film Festival Lifetime Achievement Award
 1999 - UCLA Neil H. Jacoby Award for Exceptional Contributions to Humanity
 2002 - Israeli Film Festival's Lifetime Achievement Award
 2004 - Florida Atlantic University's Louis B. Mayer Motion Picture Business Leader of the Year Award
 2004 - UCLA School of Theater, Film and Television Honorary Member Award
 2005 - Producers Guild of America Vision Award
 2005 - Inducted into the Hollywood Walk of Fame and received a star on Hollywood Blvd.
 2007 - Stella Adler Actors Studio Marlon Brando Award
 2008 - Jerusalem Film Foundation Lifetime Achievement Award
 2008 - International Student Film Festival Hollywood Lifetime Achievement Award
 2009 - Declared the honorary Doctorate at the Academy of Art in San Francisco
 2009 - Declared Chevalier of the French Government's Legion of Honor.
 2009 - Independent Spirit Award
 2010 - Bernardo O'Higgins award from the Chilean government
 2011 - The Locarno Film Festival Raimondo Rezzonico Prize (Locarno, Switzerland)
 2011 - Hebrew University Award
 2011 - Danny Kaye Humanitarian Award
 2012 - Shanghai International Film Festival – Outstanding Achievement Award
 2014 - Satellite Awards Mary Pickford Award - Outstanding Artistic Contribution to the Entertainment Industry
 2015 - Cinequest Maverick Spirit Award
 2016 - Peabody Award - Listen to Me Marlon
2019 - RiverRun International Film Festival - Master of Cinema Award
2019 - Beverly Hills Film Festival - Legends Award

Membership in film organizations
Membership in film organizations.

 Chairman of The Jury of the Tokyo Film Festival
 Advisor to The Shanghai Film Festival
 Advisor to The St. Petersburg Film Festival
 Member of the Board of the Academy of Motion Pictures, Arts and Sciences from 1977 to 1981
 One of the original founding members of the board of governors of the Sundance Institute (1978)
 Chairman Emeritus of the American Cinematheque
 Chairman Emeritus of the Stella Adler Actors Studio in New york

Books
In 2002, Simon & Schuster published Medavoy's book, You're Only As Good As Your Next One: 100 Great Films, 100 Good Films and 100 For Which I Should Be Shot, co-written by Josh Young, which became a best-seller and was subsequently released in paperback in 2003. In 2009, Mike published American Idol After Iraq; Competing for Hearts and Minds in the Global Media Age, with co-author Nathan Gardels, editor of the National Political Quarterly.

Filmography as a Producer
He was a producer in these films unless otherwise noted.

Film

As an actor

Thanks

Television

Thanks

References

External links

1941 births
Living people
American chief executives
American film producers
American film studio executives
Orion Pictures Corporation
American television producers
Harvard Kennedy School people
20th-century American Jews
University of California, Los Angeles alumni
California Democrats
Chinese emigrants to the United States
American people of Russian-Jewish descent
American people of Ukrainian-Jewish descent
Businesspeople from Shanghai
Chinese people of Russian-Jewish descent
Chinese people of Ukrainian-Jewish descent
Jews and Judaism in Shanghai
Medavoy family
American independent film production company founders
21st-century American Jews